{{Speciesbox
| taxon = Conus radiatus
| image =Conus radiatus 1.jpg
| image2 =Conus radiatus 2.jpg
| image_caption =Apertural and abapertural views of shell of  Conus radiatus Gmelin, J.F., 1791
| authority = Gmelin, 1791
| synonyms_ref = 
| synonyms =
 Conus (Phasmoconus) radiatus Gmelin, 1791 · accepted, alternate representation
 Phasmoconus radiatus (Gmelin, 1791)
 Conus martinianus Reeve, 1844
| display_parents = 3
}}Conus radiatus, common name the rayed cone, is a species of sea snail, a marine gastropod mollusk in the family Conidae, the cone snails and their allies.

Like all species within the genus Conus, these snails are predatory and venomous. They are capable of "stinging" humans, therefore live ones should be handled carefully or not at all.

Description
The size of the shell varies between 30 mm and 109 mm. The color of the shell is pale yellowish to pale chestnut, often longitudinally indistinctly marked with deeper coloring. The spire is striate. The lower part of body whorl is distantly sulcate. The white variety is frequently covered by a smooth olivaceous epidermis.

Conantokin-C is a toxin derived from the venom of Conus radiatus.

Distribution
This marine species occurs off the Philippines, New Guinea and Fiji.

References

 Tucker J.K. & Tenorio M.J. (2013) Illustrated catalog of the living cone shells''. 517 pp. Wellington, Florida: MdM Publishing.
 Puillandre N., Duda T.F., Meyer C., Olivera B.M. & Bouchet P. (2015). One, four or 100 genera? A new classification of the cone snails. Journal of Molluscan Studies. 81: 1–23

External links
 The Conus Biodiversity website
 Cone Shells - Knights of the Sea
 

radiatus
Gastropods described in 1791